Acultzingo Municipality is a municipality in Veracruz, Mexico. It is located about 220 km from state capital Xalapa to the south-west.

Borders
Acultzingo Municipality is delimited to the east by Soledad Atzompan Municipality, to the south and the west by the Puebla State and to the north by Aquila Municipality.

Products
It produces maize, rice and fabas.

Climate

References

External links 

Official page of Acultzingo Municipality
  Municipal Official Information

Municipalities of Veracruz